Thuridilla carlsoni  is a species of sacoglossan sea slug, a shell-less marine opisthobranch gastropod mollusk in the family Plakobranchidae.

Distribution 
This species occurs in the Pacific Ocean.

References

External links 

 Sea Slug Forum info

Plakobranchidae
Gastropods described in 1995